The Upside of Unrequited is a young adult novel by Becky Albertalli. It is her second novel. It revolves around the insecure Molly Peskin-Suso, who has had 26 unrequited crushes. Albertalli was loosely inspired by the novel Emma by Jane Austen and the film Clueless.

Connection to other works by Becky Albertalli 
Molly Peskin-Suso is the cousin of Abby Suso, who appears in the book Simon vs. the Homo Sapiens Agenda. There are references to Simon and his friends sprinkled throughout the novel such as characters from Simon vs. the Homo Sapiens Agenda making cameos in the book. This book is part of the “Simon-verse" along with Simon vs. the Homo Sapiens Agenda and Leah on the Offbeat.

Film 
The film rights were acquired by UK production company Shakespeare Sisters and is to be written and directed by Hillary Shakespeare and Anna-Elizabeth Shakespeare with Albertalli joining as executive producer.

References 

2017 American novels
American young adult novels
Balzer + Bray books